Ellie Louise Leach (born 15 March 2001) is an English actress best known for portraying Faye Windass on the ITV soap opera Coronation Street since 2011.

Early life
Leach was born in Bury, Greater Manchester on 15 March 2001. Leach attended Fairfield High School for Girls. Leach is a cousin of Brooke Vincent, who played Sophie Webster in Coronation Street between 2004 and 2019.

Career
Leach began her television career appearing in television advertisements for Staples and McDonald's. In 2009, Leach appeared in the film A Boy Called Dad. In 2010, Leach appeared in an episode of Moving On as Stacy. In 2011, she was cast in the role of Faye Butler, a potential adoptive child for Anna (Debbie Rush) and Eddie Windass (Steve Huison) on the ITV soap opera Coronation Street.

Personal life
Leach's cousin is Coronation Street co-star Brooke Vincent.

Filmography

Awards and nominations

References

External links
 

2001 births
Living people
English child actresses
English television actresses
English soap opera actresses
People from Bury, Greater Manchester
Actresses from Greater Manchester